The 2017–18 season was AS Monaco FC's fifth consecutive season in Ligue 1 since promotion from Ligue 2 in 2013. They were the defending Ligue 1 champions and also took part in the Coupe de France, the Coupe de la Ligue, the Trophée des Champions and the UEFA Champions League.

Squad

Out on loan

Transfers

In

 Transfers arranged on the above dates, but were not finalised until 1 July.

Out

 Transfers arranged on the above dates, but were not finalised until 1 July.

Loans out

Friendlies

Competitions

Trophée des Champions

Ligue 1

League table

Results summary

Results by round

Matches

Coupe de France

Coupe de la Ligue

UEFA Champions League

Group stage

Statistics

Appearances and goals

|-
|colspan="14"|Players away from the club on loan:

|-
|colspan="14"|Players who appeared for Monaco no longer at the club:

|}

Goalscorers

Disciplinary record

References

External links

AS Monaco FC seasons
Monaco
Monaco
AS Monaco
AS Monaco